Niksy Ahmed (born 21 February 1994) is a Sri Lankan cricketer. He made his first-class debut for Chilaw Marians Cricket Club in the 2014–15 Premier Trophy on 13 February 2015. He also played three List A matches for Chilaw Marians Cricket Club in 2014.

See also
 List of Chilaw Marians Cricket Club players

References

External links
 

1994 births
Living people
Sri Lankan cricketers
Chilaw Marians Cricket Club cricketers